The stratum basale (basal layer, sometimes referred to as stratum germinativum) is the deepest layer of the five layers of the epidermis, the external covering of skin in mammals.

The stratum basale is a single  layer of columnar or cuboidal basal cells. The cells are attached to each other and to the overlying stratum spinosum cells by desmosomes and hemidesmosomes. The nucleus is large, ovoid and occupies most of the cell. Some basal cells  can act like stem cells with the ability to divide and produce new cells, and these are sometimes called basal keratinocyte stem cells. Others serve to anchor the epidermis glabrous skin (hairless), and hyper-proliferative epidermis (from a skin disease). 

They divide to form the keratinocytes of the stratum spinosum, which migrate superficially. Other types of cells found within the stratum basale are melanocytes (pigment-producing cells) and Merkel cells (touch receptors).

Clinical significance
Basal-cell cancers,  also called basal-cell carcinomas, account for around 80 per cent of all skin cancers. Not all basal-cell cancers originate in the basal cells but they are so named because the cancer cells resemble basal cells when seen under a microscope.

Additional images

See also 
 List of keratins expressed in the human integumentary system

References

Skin anatomy
Epithelial cells